William Wombough House is a historic home located at Addison in Steuben County, New York.  It is an I-shaped, -story, side-gabled frame residence with interior ridge chimneys at each end of a metal clad roof.  It was built about 1830 and is in the transitional late-Federal / early Greek Revival style.

It was listed on the National Register of Historic Places in 2003.

References

Houses on the National Register of Historic Places in New York (state)
Houses completed in 1830
Houses in Steuben County, New York
1830 establishments in New York (state)
National Register of Historic Places in Steuben County, New York